Telescript may refer to:
 Teleprompter, a display device that prompts the person speaking with an electronic visual text
 Telescript (programming language), a programming language developed by General Magic
 Telescript, a name sometimes used to refer to the script written for a teleplay